Jasper Township is one of the ten townships of Fayette County, Ohio, United States. As of the 2010 census the population was 745, down from 857 people at the 2000 census. 588 of the residents lived in the unincorporated portions of the township in 2010.

Geography
Located in the western part of the county, it borders the following townships:
Jefferson Township - north
Union Township - east
Concord Township - southeast
Richland Township, Clinton County - south
Wilson Township, Clinton County - southwest
Jefferson Township, Greene County - west
Silvercreek Township, Greene County - northwest

Two villages are located in Jasper Township: Milledgeville in the north, and part of Octa in the northwest.

Name and history
It is the only Jasper Township statewide.

Government
The township is governed by a three-member board of trustees, who are elected in November of odd-numbered years to a four-year term beginning on the following January 1. Two are elected in the year after the presidential election and one is elected in the year before it. There is also an elected township fiscal officer, who serves a four-year term beginning on April 1 of the year after the election, which is held in November of the year before the presidential election. Vacancies in the fiscal officership or on the board of trustees are filled by the remaining trustees.

References

External links
County website

Townships in Fayette County, Ohio
Townships in Ohio